Fluridone is an organic compound that is used as aquatic herbicide often used to control invasive plants. It is used in the United States to control hydrilla and Eurasian watermilfoil among other species.  Fluridone is sold as a solution and as a slow release solid because the herbicide level must be maintained for several weeks. The compound is a colorless solid.

The compound was first reported as a possible herbicide for cotton fields in 1976. It was registered with the U.S. Environmental Protection Agency in 1986 and has low toxicity to animals with no restrictions on swimming or drinking in treated water bodies. Fluridone breaks down in the environment over days or weeks with the major degradation product being N-methyl formamide. The half-life of fluridone in soils and sediments has been estimated at nine months. Fluridone degradation in soil and saturated sediment has been correlated with temperature and clay content, while fluridone degradation in water is largely dependent on UV light exposure. Fluridone transport through the soil, vadose zone, and aquifer is limited by its strong sorbance to organic matter.

Molecular target 
Fluridone is a systemic herbicide that works by interfering with carotene formation which leads to chlorophyll degradation.

Pharmaceutical 
Fluridone's main action to disrupt photosynthesis in plants is by preventing the secretion of abscisic acid. As higher eukaryotes, such as humans, also rely on an abscisic acid pathway to create inflammation in normal physiological processes, fluridone could be investigated as being of interest in the development of anti-inflammatory agents.

Biodegradation
Fluridone degrades in soil and upon exposure to sunlight with approximate halflives of 21 and 1 day, respectively.

See also
Stormy Lake (Alaska), a lake that was treated with fluridone to remove invasive Elodea, an aquatic plant.

References

External links
EPA Substance Registry, entry for Fluridone
 BREDA list of 1,5-Cis-Phytoene desaturase inhibitors

Herbicides
Trifluoromethyl compounds
Nonsteroidal anti-inflammatory drugs
4-Pyridones